Ermentrude (French: Ermentrude de France; 875/78–?) was a Princess of France in the Middle Ages, named after her grandmother, Queen Ermentrude of Orléans.

Ermentrude was a daughter of King Louis the Stammerer and his first wife,  Ansgarde of Burgundy, whom he married in 862 with official sanction. 

Despite having several children together (2 sons, Louis and Carloman and 3 daughters, Giselle, Hildegarde and Ermentrude) with Ansgarde of Burgundy, Louis had his marriage with Ansgarde annulled, prior to his marriage with Adelaide of Paris in 875. 

After the death of Louis, the struggle for power in the kingdom probably led to Ermentrude’s marriage to Evrard de Sulichgau, son of Unroch III of Friuli. 

Ermentrude’s daughter, Cunigunda, first in 909 married Wigeric of Lotharingia, count of Bidgau and count palatine of Lotharingia, then in 922 married Ricwin, Count of Verdun (d. 923).

Notes

870s births
Year of birth uncertain
Year of death missing
Carolingian dynasty
French princesses
Women from the Carolingian Empire
9th-century French women
9th-century French people
Daughters of kings